Gayman is a surname. Notable people with the surname include:

Dan Gayman, founder of the Church of Israel
Elesha Gayman, American politician

See also
 Gayman Elementary School, primary school in Pennsylvania
 Gaiman (disambiguation)
 Gay men